Mark Ormrod (born 1 December 1982 in Adelaide) is an Australian athlete. He originally played soccer, but quit the sport to start a career in athletics, his special distance being 400 Metres. He attended Adelaide private school Pedare Christian College

He competed in the 2004 Olympics as a part of the Australian team that won the silver medal in the 4 × 400 metres relay. In 2006 the Australian relay team won the gold medal at the Commonwealth Games.

In May 2006, Ormrod moved to the Australian Institute of Sport in Canberra, where he trained as a full-time athlete. He went to the 2007 World University Games in Bangkok, Thailand where he was part of the silver medal-winning 4 × 400 m team. He also ran in the 2007 World Championships in Osaka Japan, again in the 4 × 400 m relay.

After returning to Adelaide in October 2007, Ormrod prepared for the 2008 Beijing Olympic Games and once again teamed up with John Steffenson to run in the 4 × 400 m relay. After running in the heat where he officially recorded a 45.39 split, he was replaced in the final where the team ultimately finished 6th.

Ormrod rested from the 2008/09 domestic season and the 2009 World Championships in Berlin. He competed on the 2009/2010 Australian domestic scene improving his 100m PB to 10.46 (previously 10.58 in 2005) and his 200m PB to 21.00 (previously 21.02 in 2005). Ormrod retired from athletics after the 2010 Australian championships in Perth.

PB's:
 100m - 10.46 (26 March 2010, Perth WA) 
 200m - 21.00 (17 April 2010, Perth WA)
 400m - 45.62 (01/12/2005, Melbourne VIC)

External links
 Athens 2004 bio

Australian male sprinters
1982 births
Living people
Athletes (track and field) at the 2004 Summer Olympics
Athletes (track and field) at the 2008 Summer Olympics
Olympic athletes of Australia
Athletes from Adelaide
Olympic silver medalists for Australia
Commonwealth Games medallists in athletics
Medalists at the 2004 Summer Olympics
Olympic silver medalists in athletics (track and field)
Commonwealth Games gold medallists for Australia
Universiade medalists in athletics (track and field)
Athletes (track and field) at the 2006 Commonwealth Games
Universiade silver medalists for Australia
Medalists at the 2007 Summer Universiade
Medallists at the 2006 Commonwealth Games